Green Is Blues is the second studio album by American singer and songwriter Al Green, released by Hi in April of 1969. Green Is Blues, released two days after Green's 23rd birthday, is considered his breakthrough album by critics and fans alike after the lukewarm reception of his debut Back Up Train (1967). Green Is Blues marks the first collaboration of Green and musician Willie Mitchell, who also serves as the album's main producer, a collaboration that lasted both of the careers of Green and Mitchell. The co-founder and President of Hi Records, Joe Cuoghi, acted as the recording supervisor. He died of a heart attack in July 1970. 

Upon the album's '40th Anniversary' re-release as a digital deluxe package in July 2009, noted soul writer Pete Lewis of the award-winning 'Blues & Soul' stated: "Significant for matching for the first time Green's soulful refined vocal brilliance with the skilful production of co-writer/producer Willie Mitchell and the tight arrangements of Memphis' renowned Hi Rhythm Section, the album ushered in a new era for "The Memphis Sound" – effectively kick-starting a studio partnership between Green and Mitchell that would see Al go on to become the premier soul superstar of the early Seventies – and arguably the last great Southern soul singer, period."

Track listing
 "One Woman" (Charles Chalmers, Sandra Rhodes) – 3:05
 "Talk to Me" (Joe Seneca) – 2:06
 "My Girl" (Smokey Robinson, Ronald White) – 2:55
 "The Letter" (Wayne Carson Thompson) – 2:28
 "I Stand Accused" (Jerry Butler, Curtis Mayfield, Billy Butler) – 3:18
 "Gotta Find a New World" (Carl Smith, Marion "Doc" Oliver) – 2:25
 "What Am I Gonna Do with Myself?" (Willie Mitchell, Marshall "Rock" Jones) – 2:27
 "Tomorrow's Dream" (Al Green, Willie Mitchell) – 2:19
 "Get Back Baby" (Al Green) – 2:16
 "Get Back" (John Lennon, Paul McCartney) – 2:22
 "Summertime" (George Gershwin, Ira Gershwin, DuBose Heyward) – 3:08

40th Anniversary Edition
The track listing for 40th anniversary edition, released 2009, includes four additional tracks:
  "I Want to Hold Your Hand" (John Lennon, Paul McCartney) – 2:20
 "Nothing Impossible With Love" (Jimmy Reed) – 2:37
 "Baby, What's Wrong with You" – 3:41
 "Memphis, Tennessee" (Chuck Berry) – 3:15

Later samples
"The Letter"
"L.A. L.A." by Capone-N-Noreaga from the album The War Report
"Long Kiss Goodnight" by The Notorious B.I.G. from the album Life After Death
"Creation & Destruction" by Immortal Technique from the album Revolutionary Vol. 1
"Somma Time Man" by Salt-N-Pepa from the album Very Necessary
"Gotta Find a New World"
"Iron Maiden" by Ghostface Killah from the album Ironman

References

Al Green albums
1969 albums
Hi Records albums
Albums produced by Willie Mitchell (musician)